Dickeyville is a village in Grant County, Wisconsin, United States. The population was 1,061 at the 2010 census.

The Dickeyville Grotto is located in the heart of the village.

History
Dickeyville was not formally platted. The village was named for Charles Dickey, who opened a general store in the early 1840s. He was also the first postmaster when the post office was established (as Dickeysville) in 1849.

Geography

Demographics

2010 census
As of the census of 2010, there were 1,061 people, 459 households, and 289 families living in the village. The racial makeup of the village was 99.1% White, 0.2% African American, 0.4% from other races, and 0.4% from two or more races. Hispanic or Latino of any race were 1.1% of the population.

There were 459 households, of which 28.5% had children under the age of 18 living with them, 54.5% were married couples living together, 6.5% had a female householder with no husband present, 2.0% had a male householder with no wife present, and 37.0% were non-families. 31.8% of all households were made up of individuals, and 12.9% had someone living alone who was 65 years of age or older. The average household size was 2.31 and the average family size was 2.93.

The median age in the village was 40.7 years. 24% of residents were under the age of 18; 5.5% were between the ages of 18 and 24; 25.6% were from 25 to 44; 24.8% were from 45 to 64; and 20.1% were 65 years of age or older. The gender makeup of the village was 49.6% male and 50.4% female.

2000 census
As of the census of 2000, there were 1,043 people, 420 households, and 299 families living in the village. The population density was 1,197.3 people per square mile (462.9/km2). There were 431 housing units at an average density of 494.8 per square mile (191.3/km2). The racial makeup of the village was 99.52% White, 0.29% Asian, and 0.19% from two or more races. Hispanic or Latino of any race were 0.29% of the population.

There were 420 households, out of which 28.1% had children under the age of 18 living with them, 62.9% were married couples living together, 6.9% had a female householder with no husband present, and 28.8% were non-families. 25.5% of all households were made up of individuals, and 10.7% had someone living alone who was 65 years of age or older. The average household size was 2.48 and the average family size was 2.96.

In the village, the population was spread out, with 24.6% under the age of 18, 8.1% from 18 to 24, 26.8% from 25 to 44, 24.8% from 45 to 64, and 15.5% who were 65 years of age or older. The median age was 38 years. For every 100 females, there were 97.2 males. For every 100 females age 18 and over, there were 96.0 males.

The median income for a household in the village was $47,353, and the median income for a family was $56,875. Males had a median income of $32,625 versus $26,944 for females. The per capita income for the village was $23,147. About 6.9% of families and 11.7% of the population were below the poverty line, including 20.4% of those under age 18 and 3.8% of those age 65 or over.

Notable person
Bill Burbach, professional baseball player.

References

External links
 Dickeyville, Wisconsin

Villages in Grant County, Wisconsin
Villages in Wisconsin